Raccoon Creek (also called Coon Creek) is a stream in Daviess and Grundy counties in the U.S. state of Missouri. It is a tributary of Sugar Creek. The confluence is 1.5 miles southeast of the community of Brimson and 1.5 mile west of Sugar Creeks confluence with the Thompson River.

Raccoon Creek most likely was named for the raccoons in the immediate area.

See also
List of rivers of Missouri

References

Rivers of Daviess County, Missouri
Rivers of Grundy County, Missouri
Rivers of Missouri